Oleh Petrovych Omelchuk (born 7 June 1983) is a Ukrainian sport shooter who competes in the men's 10 metre air pistol and the men's 50 metre pistol. He is the 2014 European 10 m pistol champion.

Career
Omelchuk has represented Ukraine at three Olympics. At the 2008 Summer Olympics, he finished in 16th place in the men's 10 m air pistol, and in 4th place in the 50 m pistol, losing out on the bronze medal to Russia's Vladimir Isakov in a shoot-off.

At the 2012 Summer Olympics, Omelchuk finished 5th in the final round of the men's 10 m air pistol and in 29th place in the men's 50 m pistol. He also competed at the 2016 Summer Olympics in Rio de Janeiro.

27 July 2021, at the 2020 Summer Olympics (Tokyo) Oleh Omelchuk and Olena Kostevych won a bronze medal in the 10 m air pistol.

References

External links

Ukrainian male sport shooters
1983 births
Living people
Olympic shooters of Ukraine
Shooters at the 2008 Summer Olympics
Shooters at the 2012 Summer Olympics
Shooters at the 2016 Summer Olympics
Shooters at the 2020 Summer Olympics
Shooters at the 2015 European Games
ISSF pistol shooters
Shooters at the 2019 European Games
European Games medalists in shooting
European Games silver medalists for Ukraine
Medalists at the 2020 Summer Olympics
Olympic bronze medalists for Ukraine
Olympic medalists in shooting
Sportspeople from Rivne Oblast